The following highways are numbered 20A:

New Zealand
 New Zealand State Highway 20A

United States
 U.S. Route 20A (New York)
 U.S. Route 20A (Ohio)
 County Road 20A (Putnam County, Florida)
 Massachusetts Route 20A
 Nebraska Highway 20A (former)
 Nebraska Link 20A
 New York State Route 20A (1930–1932) (former)
 New York State Route 20A (1938–1939) (former)